The 2010 Allianz Suisse Open Gstaad was a men's tennis tournament played on outdoor clay courts. It was the 42nd edition of the Allianz Suisse Open Gstaad, and was part of the ATP World Tour 250 Series of the 2009 ATP Tour. It took place at the Roy Emerson Arena in Gstaad, Switzerland, from 25 July through 1 August 2010.

ATP entrants

Seeds

*Seedings based on the July 19, 2010 rankings.

Other entrants
The following players received wildcards into the singles main draw
  Michael Lammer
  Alexander Sadecky
  Agustín Velotti

The following players received entry from the qualifying draw:
  Farrukh Dustov
  Andreas Haider-Maurer
  Yann Marti
  Yuri Schukin

Finals

Singles

 Nicolás Almagro defeated  Richard Gasquet, 7–5, 6–1
It was Almagro's second title of the year and 7th of his career.

Doubles

 Johan Brunström /  Jarkko Nieminen defeated  Marcelo Melo /  Bruno Soares, 6–3, 6–7(4–7), [11–9]

External links
Official website

 
Allianz Suisse Open Gstaad
2010